William Percillier (Born 30 January 1999) is a Canadian rugby union player. His usual position is as a scrum-half, and he currently plays for Stade Français in the Top 14.

Club statistics

References

External links
ESPN Profile

1999 births
Living people
Sportspeople from Bordeaux
Stade Français players
Rugby union scrum-halves
Canadian rugby union players